Abraham HaKohen of Kalisk (1741–1810) was a prominent Chassidic rabbi of the 3rd generation of Chassidic leaders. He was a disciple of Dov Ber of Mezeritch.

Biography
Avraham was born in 1741 in Kalyshki, Belarus to Alexander. In his youth, Abraham Kalisker studied Torah with the Vilna Gaon, who later became the leader of the mitnagdim - i.e. those who opposed Hasidic Judaism.

Kalisker and his followers took an emotional and mystical approach towards the service of God in contrast to the formalism of traditional religious scholars, who focused on Talmudic study. After the death in 1772 of his teacher, Dov Ber Mezeritch, most of the opposition to hasidism was directed against Kalisker and his disciples.

In 1777, at about age 36, he joined the first hasidic aliyah under the leadership of Menachem Mendel of Vitebsk and emigrated to the Holy Land. He died in Tiberias on 9 January 1810.

References

1741 births
1810 deaths
Hasidic rebbes
18th-century rabbis from the Russian Empire
Emigrants from the Russian Empire to the Ottoman Empire
Kohanim writers of Rabbinic literature
Burials at the Old Jewish Cemetery, Tiberias
People from Liozna District